Dihydroxyflavone may refer to:

 Chrysin (5,7-dihydroxyflavone)
 4',7-Dihydroxyflavone
 7,8-Dihydroxyflavone